Magway Region Government is the cabinet of Magway Region. The cabinet is led by the chief minister, Tint Lwin.

Cabinet (August 2021–present)

References

 Magway Region